was a Japanese mathematical physicist and mathematician who worked on the foundations of quantum field theory, on quantum statistical mechanics, and on the theory of operator algebras.

Biography 
Araki is the son of the University of Kyoto physics professor Gentarō Araki, with whom he studied and with whom in 1954 he published his first physics paper. He earned his diploma under Hideki Yukawa and in 1960 he attained his doctorate at Princeton University with thesis advisors Rudolf Haag and Arthur Wightman. He was a professor at the University of Kyoto starting in 1966, and became the director of the Research Institute for Mathematical Sciences (RIMS).

Araki died on 16 December 2022.

Research
Araki worked on axiomatic quantum field theory, statistical mechanics, and in particular on applications of operator algebras like von Neumann algebras and C*-algebras. At the beginning of the 1960s, in Princeton, he made important contributions to local quantum physics and to the scattering theories of Haag and David Ruelle. He also supplied important contributions in the mathematical theory of operator algebras, classifying the type-III factors of von Neumann algebras. Araki originated the concept of relative entropy of states of von Neumann algebras. In the 1970s he showed the equivalence in quantum thermodynamics of, on the one hand, the KMS condition (named after Ryogo Kubo, Paul C. Martin, and Julian Schwinger) for the characterization of quantum mechanical states in thermodynamic equilibrium with, on the other hand, the variational principle for quantum mechanical spin systems on lattices. With Yanase he worked on the foundations of quantum mechanics, i.e. the Wigner-Araki-Yanase theorem, which describes restrictions that conservation laws impose upon the physical measuring process. Stated in more precise terms, they proved that an exact measurement of an operator, which additively replaces the operator with a conserved size, is impossible. However, Yanase did prove that the uncertainty of the measurement can be made arbitrarily small, provided that the measuring apparatus is sufficiently large.

Honors and awards 
Huzihiro Araki was an invited speaker at the International Congress of Mathematicians in 1970 in Nice and in 1978 in Helsinki. He was the second president of the International Association of Mathematical Physics, during the period 1979–1981. In 2003 he received, together with Oded Schramm and Elliott Lieb, the Henri Poincaré Prize. In 1990 he was the chief organizer of the International Congress of Mathematicians in Kyoto. He was editor of the scientific journal Communications in Mathematical Physics and founder of Reviews in Mathematical Physics. In 2012 he became a fellow of the American Mathematical Society.

Selected works

See also 

 Araki–Sucher correction
 Algebraic quantum field theory
 C*-algebra
 KMS state
 Local quantum physics
 Quantum field theory
 Quantum thermodynamics
 Von Neumann algebra

References

Further reading

External links 
 
 .
 .
 

20th-century Japanese physicists
20th-century Japanese mathematicians
21st-century Japanese mathematicians
1932 births
2022 deaths
Kyoto University alumni
Princeton University alumni
Academic staff of Kyoto University
Fellows of the American Mathematical Society
Mathematical physicists
Presidents of the International Association of Mathematical Physics